Sir Edward Walter Eveleigh, ERD (8 October 1917 - 24 September 2014) was a British barrister, judge and British Army officer. He presided over a number of high-profile cases including that of the serial killer Graham Young and the former MP John Stonehouse. He went on to serve as a Lord Justice of Appeal from 1977 to 1985.

Early life
Eveleigh was born on 8 October 1917 in Eastleigh, Hampshire. His father was a railway clerk. He was educated at Peter Symonds Grammar School, an all-boys grammar school in Winchester. While at school, he held the record for the 100-yard dash. He was a member of his school's Officer Training Corps, the forerunner to the Combined Cadet Force.

He studied law at Brasenose College, Oxford University. Following a break in his studies when he was called up at the start of WW2, he graduated in 1940 with a Bachelor of Arts (BA) degree. This was later promoted to Master of Arts (MA Oxon), as per tradition.

Career

Military service
Eveleigh was commissioned into the reserve of the Royal Regiment of Artillery on 29 August 1936 as a second lieutenant. He was called up at the start of World War II and served for six weeks during the Phoney War before returning to his university studies.

Legal career
He took silk in 1961, having been appointed a Queen's Counsel (QC) on 10 April of that year.

On 25 April 1961, he was appointed a Recorder, a part-time judge, sitting at the magistrates' court of Burton-upon-Trent.

Arms

References

1917 births
2014 deaths
Queen's Bench Division judges
Alumni of Brasenose College, Oxford
People educated at Peter Symonds College
Royal Artillery officers
Lords Justices of Appeal
Knights Bachelor
British Army personnel of World War II
Members of the Privy Council of the United Kingdom